Robert James Wilson (birth registered March 1879 – February 1916) was an English professional rugby league footballer who played in the 1900s. He played at representative level for England and Lancashire, and at club level for Broughton Rangers.

Background
Bob Wilson was born in Carnforth, Lancashire, his birth was registered in Lancaster, Lancashire, and his death aged 38 was registered in Prestwich, Lancashire, England.

Playing career

International honours
Bob Wilson won a cap for England while at Broughton Rangers in 1905 against Other Nationalities.

County honours
Bob Wilson won caps for Lancashire while at Broughton Rangers.

Club records
Bob Wilson holds Broughton Rangers/Belle Vue Rangers' most tries in a season, with 33-appearances in the 1901–02 season.

References

External links

1879 births
1916 deaths
Broughton Rangers captains
Broughton Rangers players
England national rugby league team players
English rugby league players
Lancashire rugby league team players
People from Carnforth
Rugby league players from Lancashire